Slender myoporum is a common name for several plants and may refer to:

Myoporum floribundum
Myoporum parvifolium